Eoophyla snelleni is a moth in the family Crambidae. It was described by Georg Semper in 1902. It is found on Luzon in the Philippines.

References

Eoophyla
Moths described in 1902